Margarete Blank (1901–1945) was a German medical doctor who was executed for defeatist speech in 1945.  There are now several memorials to her including street names in Engelsdorf and Panitzsch; old people's homes in Prenzlau and Thekla, Leipzig; schools in Panitzsch and Torgau; and an annual prize for a work of medical history at the Leipzig Medical School.

References 

1901 births
1945 deaths
20th-century German physicians
German resistance to Nazism
People executed by Nazi Germany by guillotine
Ukrainian people executed by Nazi Germany
Physicians from Kyiv
Emigrants from the Russian Empire to Germany
Saefkow-Jacob-Bästlein Organization